George Skafidas (born Georgios Skafidas, ; 19 August 1971) is a former middle-distance runner and currently an athletics and multisport coach. His field of expertise is biomechanics, physiology and sports periodization. He is also one of the oldest active players in Greek football and considered one of the best Greek performance coaches of the 1990s and 2000s.

Career
Skafidas started his athletics career as a middle-distance runner from club Pelasgos in the early 1980s, while also being a football player for Haravgi Larissa. After becoming an athletics coach in 1991 he continued competing as a middle-distance runner for several years. During the 1990s and early 2000s he was hired by the Hellenic Athletics Federation and trained athletes in preparation for the  
2004 Athens Olympics and also cooperated with many Greek basketball, volleyball, and football players. With Greece winning a country-record of 16 medals, Skafidas accepted the British Athletics Federation's offer to become a chief trainer and moved to the United Kingdom in 2004.

UK Anti-Doping ban
On 12 June 2011, GB sprinter Bernice Wilson who Skafidas was coaching tested positive following an in-competition test at the Bedford International Games. Skafidas was accused by Wilson that he had administered testosterone and other prohibited substances to her. As a result Bernice Wilson was banned from all sport for four years, on 13 September 2011.On August 28, 2013, the Bristih federation banned him from holding any UKA license for five years after former GB sprinter Bernice Wilson who he was coaching was banned for a drugs offence violating the anti-doping rule. Two years later, on 23 November 2015, Skafidas was provisionally suspended by Britain's governing body in a decision issued by UK Anti-Doping (UKAD) and in accordance with IAAF Anti-Doping Rules. On 16 March 2016, he eventually received a lifetime ban from all sport following nine Anti-Doping Rule Violations, all related to his conduct with international sprinter Bernice Wilson, as it was confirmed by UK Anti-Doping. Skafidas was running a training group for young athletes at the Princess Royal Sports Arena in Lincolnshire at the time.He had also worked as a coaching supervisor for various professional football clubs in England and coached tennis, and cricket British athletes.

Recent years
In the summer of 2016 he was hired as a trainer by revived Greek basketball club Gymnastikos, Vassilis Spanoulis' first ever team. He had coached Olympic-Nees Karyes FC the previous season. In 2020 he joined as a trainer ambitious fourth-tier football club Pyrros  while his efforts to reactivate his former football club Haravgi Larissa were met with success. He was elected club president in 2021 and also joined the team as a player and coaching supervisor.Skafidas also helped the 1970s founded Federation of International Subbuteo Associations come back to life and become part of the FISTF (Federation of International Sports Table Football) a couple years ago, being one of its leading members. He also works as a physical education school teacher and University sports lecturer.

References

1971 births
Living people
Athletics (track and field) coaches
Greek sportsmen
Haravgi Larissa F.C. players
Athletes from Larissa